Stanley Ernest Brunst (1894 – 6 January 1962) was a Canadian painter, best known for his early abstractions.

Career
Brunst came to Canada with his family at around the age of 18 and settled in Saskatoon in 1923 where he worked in construction and then as a dry-cleaner.  He studied at the University of Saskatchewan with Augustus Kenderdine in an evening class for four years in the 1930s but was mainly self-taught. In 1936, he began to paint abstractly. He moved to Vancouver in 1941, held two solo shows at the Vancouver Art Gallery and was a member of the B.C. Society of Artists. He died in Vancouver. The Mendel Art Gallery organized his retrospective in 1982, titled Stanley E. Brunst, Radical Painter: An Exhibition.

References

Further reading 

20th-century Canadian artists
1894 births
1962 deaths
British emigrants to Canada
Canadian abstract artists